Philip Houlbrooke Nicklin (1786 – 2 March 1842) was an American bookseller, publisher and writer.  In 1829, Nicklin was elected to the American Philosophical Society. In 1834, a trustee himself, he reported to the trustees of the University of Pennsylvania "concerning the universities of Oxford and Cambridge in England".

Nicklin studied at Nassau Hall graduating in 1804. He died suddenly in Philadelphia in 1842.

Bibliography
 Letters Descriptive of the Virginia Springs (1835) (as Peregrine Prolix)
 A Pleasant Peregrination Through the Prettiest Parts of Pennsylvania (1836) (as Peregrine Prolix)
 A Report Made to the Board of Trustees of the University of Pennsylvania, etc... (1834)
 Remarks on Literary Property incorporating work by Joseph Lowe

References

1786 births
1842 deaths
American male writers